Angelica atropurpurea, known commonly as purplestem angelica, great angelica, American angelica, high angelica, and masterwort, is a species of flowering plant that can be found in moist and swampy woodlands, mostly by riverbanks, in eastern North America.

Description
The erect, branching stem is purple, smooth, hollow, and sturdy. The compound leaves are bipinnate, with 3 to 5 leaflets per leaf. They are generally ovate with serrated margins, and some are cleft into either shallow or deep lobes.

The plant has white to greenish flowers in umbrella-like umbels.

Distribution and habitat
It has been found in eastern Canada (Nunavut, Ontario, Quebec, Labrador, Newfoundland, all 3 Maritime Provinces) and the United States (from New England south as far as North Carolina, and west to Minnesota, Iowa, and Tennessee). The plant grows in swamps, wet thickets, edges of woodlands next to wetlands, marshes, fens, and seeps. It is typically found in calcareous habitats with a consistent moisture.

Ecology
Flowers bloom late spring to early summer. A. atropurpurea is a host plant for the black swallowtail butterfly (Papilio polyxenes), the short-tailed swallowtail (Papilio brevicauda), and the moths Agonopterix clemensella, Papaipema harrisii, and Idia americalis. The nectar of the flowers attracts small bees.

Uses
The stalks can be eaten like celery and the flavor is similar. Early American settlers boiled parts of the plant to make into candy and added it to cakes. In Europe, it was believed that the plant could cure alcoholism.

The aromatic root of angelica has widespread use as a purification herb among the Native American cultures. In California, it is often burned during a shaman's prayers in a healing ceremony. It has traditionally been held in high esteem by native peoples in Arkansas, who have often carried it in their medicine bags and mixed it with tobacco for smoking. Medicinally,  is used by the Creeks to: cure back pain in adults; to calm panic attacks or people that are in hysterics; as a vermifuge in children; as well as treating stomach disorders. Mvskoke Creek Ceremonial uses include preventing heat stroke during the Ribbon Dance in the Green Corn Ceremony, aiding ceremonial singers, and to help those in legal trouble.

References

atropurpurea
Flora of Eastern Canada
Plants described in 1753
Taxa named by Carl Linnaeus
Flora of the Northeastern United States
Flora of the North-Central United States
Flora of the Southeastern United States